Chimney Rock Farm, also known as The Willows, is a historic home located near Tazewell, Tazewell County, Virginia. It was built about 1843, and consists of a pedimented two-story, three-bay, center section flanked by one-story wings in the Palladian style.  It is constructed of brick and sits on a high basement.

It was listed on the National Register of Historic Places in 1982.

References

Houses on the National Register of Historic Places in Virginia
Palladian Revival architecture in Virginia
Houses completed in 1843
Houses in Tazewell County, Virginia
National Register of Historic Places in Tazewell County, Virginia
1843 establishments in Virginia